Tabuk Castle (qalʿat tabūk) is an ancient castle in Tabuk, the capital city of the Tabuk Region in northwestern Saudi Arabia which dates back to 1559. The castle has been rehabilitated and transformed into a museum open to all visitors.

History 
Although it is believed that castle was built about 3500 BC and mentioned in the Quran as of Aṣḥāb al-Aykah ( "Companions of the Wood"), the known origin dates back to 1559. It was constructed to protect the water station as well as for security and surveillance purposes and was one of the stations on the Levant-Medina Haj road to welcome the pilgrims.

Structure 
The castle consists of two stories connected by a stairway and encompassing a mosque and various rooms where the second floor involves an open mosque.

References 



Castles in Saudi Arabia
Tourist attractions in Saudi Arabia